Pseudomonas tuticorinensis is a Gram-negative, marine denitrifying bacterium. The type strain is ATCC 12230.

References

Pseudomonadales
Bacteria described in 1956